Provincial Trunk Highway 10A (PTH 10A) is the name of four provincial primary highways located in the Canadian province of Manitoba.  These highways are alternate routes of PTH 10, and each section was the original alignment of the parent highway.  The four sections are located in Flin Flon, Swan River, Ethelbert, and Dauphin.

Flin Flon section

The section in Flin Flon follows the original alignment of PTH 10.  The current alignment of PTH 10 bypasses around Flin Flon and into the downtown area.  Starting at PTH 10, it follows 3rd Ave. E. through most of Flin Flon until turning right on Callinan Ln. and left on 1st Ave. until it reaches PTH 10 again, about 600m from where PTH 10 meets the Saskatchewan boundary.  The speed limit on the route is 50 km/h.

Swan River section

The section of PTH 10A in Swan River is an important route providing connections to PR 275 and PTH 83A.  It branches off from PTH 10 north of Swan River.  Once within Swan River it becomes 4th Ave. N.  Just a few metres from entering Swan River, the highway intersects PR 275. The highway meets PTH 83A (Main St.) southwest of the town centre and turns left.  The two highways run in concurrence through the town centre along Main Street until they terminate at PTH 10 and the current northbound terminus for PTH 83.  On the route, the speed limit is mainly 50 km/h, and 80 km/h approaching PTH 10 on the north side.

Ethelbert section

The section of PTH 10A in Ethelbert goes through the town, while PTH 10 bypasses it. It branches off PTH 10 just west of Ethelbert (PR 274 branches off this intersection in the opposite direction and travels south) and becomes Main St once inside the town until it intersects with Second Avenue.

From this intersection, PTH 10A turns right and merges with PTH 10 about two kilometres south of the town.

Dauphin section

The fourth and last section of PTH 10 is located in Dauphin.  It starts at PTH 5/10 west of the city and from there overlaps Provincial Trunk Highway 5A (PTH 5A). PTH 5A/10A runs concurrently for the entire route.

At the city limits, the road becomes Buchanon Avenue until it intersects with PR 362 (Keays Street).  Past this intersection, PTH 5A/10A becomes 2nd Avenue NW and travels in a southeast direction until it meets PTH 20A (Main Street N.) in Dauphin's city centre and turns right. PTH 20A comes into the concurrency for about 20m before turning left on to 1st Avenue N.E.

PTH 5A/10A continues along Main Street S. to its terminus with PTH 5/10 at the south end of the city.

References

External links
Official Highway Map of Manitoba - Flin Flon
Official Highway Map of Manitoba - Dauphin
Official Name and Location - Declaration of Provincial Trunk Highways Regulation — The Highways and Transportation Act — Provincial Government of Manitoba

See also

PTH 10 - the highway's parent route.
PTH 110 - a bypass around the city of Brandon.

010A